Samwiri Namakhetsa Khaemba Wabulakha is an Anglican bishop in Uganda: he was Bishop of Mbale until 2008.

References

21st-century Anglican bishops in Uganda
Uganda Christian University alumni
Anglican bishops of Mbale